Nuun Ujol Kʼinich (fl. 800?), was an ajaw of the Maya city of Tikal. He ruled sometime between 794 and 810 and he was probably father of Dark Sun.

Notes

Footnotes

References
 

Rulers of Tikal
8th century in the Maya civilization
9th century in the Maya civilization
8th-century monarchs in North America
9th-century monarchs in North America
8th century in Guatemala
9th century in Guatemala